Live at Royal Albert Hall is the second concert film by Yanni, recorded in November 1995 at the Royal Albert Hall and featuring the Royal Albert Hall Organ in performance with Yanni's own symphony orchestra. The corresponding concert tour for 1995 was Yanni Live, The Symphony Concerts 1995.

Track listing

Yanni Live, 1995 World Tour

Personnel

Band
Charlie Adams – drums
Karen Briggs – violin
Lynn Davis – vocals
Fran Logan – vocals
Pedro Eustache – flutes, chorus in Niki Nana
Ric Fierabracci – bass guitar
Ming Freeman – keyboards
Daniel de los Reyes – percussion
David Kennedy – didgeridoo

Conductor
Armen Anassian – conductor, violin soloist

Orchestra
Clif Foster – first violin, concertmaster
Jim Shallenberger – first violin 
Dana Freeman – first violin, chorus in Niki Nana
Will Logan – first violin 
Pam Moore – first violin 
Rhonni Hallman – first violin
Julie Metz – first violin 
Vivian Wolf – first violin, chorus in Niki Nana
Neal Laite – second violin
Marilyn Harding – second violin 
Ann Lasley – second violin, chorus in Niki Nana
Delia Park – second violin, chorus in Niki Nana
Cheryl Ongaro – second violin 
Jonathan Dysart – second violin 
Desiree Hume – second violin
Lynn Grants – viola
Cathy Paynter – viola, chorus in Niki Nana
Diane Reedy – viola
Helen Crosby – viola, chorus in Niki Nana
Sarah O'Brien – cello
Maurice Grants – cello
John Krovoza – cello
Lisa Pribanic – cello
Gary Lasley – contrabass, chorus in Niki Nana
Cheryl Foster – oboe
Jim Foschia – clarinet
April Aoki – harp
Matt Reynolds – French horn, chorus in Niki Nana
Jim Avery – French horn 
James Mattos – French horn
Ron Applegate – French horn, chorus in Niki Nana
Ray Brown – trumpet, flugelhorn
Kerry Hughes – trumpet 
Rich Berkeley – trombone 
Dana Hughes – trombone and bass trombone

Production
Executive producer – Yanni
Produced by – George Veras, Yanni
Directed by – Kate Ferris
Music video producer/director – George Veras
Music video technical producer – Brian Powers, PMTV
Lighting Designers – Lee Rose, David Kaniski

External links
 Official Website

Yanni video albums
Yanni concert tours
Live albums recorded at the Royal Albert Hall
1995 video albums
Live video albums
1995 live albums